The following is a list of the 546 communes of the Pyrénées-Atlantiques department of France.

The communes cooperate in the following intercommunalities (as of 2020):
Communauté d'agglomération Pau Béarn Pyrénées
Communauté d'agglomération du Pays Basque
Communauté de communes Adour Madiran (partly)
Communauté de communes du Béarn des Gaves
Communauté de communes du Haut Béarn
Communauté de communes de Lacq-Orthez
Communauté de communes des Luys en Béarn
Communauté de communes du Nord-Est Béarn
Communauté de communes du Pays de Nay (partly)
Communauté de communes de la Vallée d'Ossau

References

Pyrenees-Atlantiques